The 1996 Russian Indoor Athletics Championships was the 5th edition of the national championship in indoor track and field for Russia. It was held on 23–25 February at the Alexander Gomelsky Universal Sports Hall CSKA in Moscow. A total of 26 events (13 for men and 13 for women) were contested over the two-day competition. It was used for selection of the Russian team for the 1996 European Athletics Indoor Championships.

Championships
In the winter of 1996, Russian championships were also held in the following disciplines:

9–11 February — Russian Combined Events Indoor Championships (Lipetsk)
10–11 February – Russian 24-Hour Run Indoor Championships (Podolsk)

Results

Men

Women

Russian Combined Events Indoor Championships 
The Russian Combined Events Indoor Championships was held on 9–11 February 1996 in Lipetsk in the Yubileiny Sports Palace. Yelena Lebedenko set a personal record and for the first time in her career became national champion. Her score of 4735 points was the best in the world that year for women's indoor pentathlon.

Men

Women

Russian 24-Hour Run Indoor Championships 
The Russian 24-Hour Run Indoor Championships was held on 10–11 February in Podolsk on the 133-meter circle of the arena of the local youth sports school. Competitions were held as part of the Podolsk Day super marathon and were held in memory of Nikolay Safin, who had established here the highest world achievement three years earlier (275,576 m). Elena Sidorenkova set a world record distance of 248,901 m in the women's race. However, this result (like Safin's record) was not ratified by the international association due to the uncertified track length and the lack of strict documentation of the circles passed by the participants.

Men

Women

International team selection
Following the results of the championships, taking into account the qualifying standards, the Russian team for the 1996 European Athletics Indoor Championships included:

Men
60 m: Andrey Fedoriv, Pavel Galkin
200 m: Andrey Fedoriv
400 m: Aleksandr Dobryanskiy
1500 m: Andrey Zadorozhnyy
60 m hurdles: Andrey Kislykh
High jump: Leonid Pumalainen
Pole vault: Viktor Chistiakov†, Pyotr Bochkaryov
Long jump: Kirill Sosunov†, Yuriy Naumkin†
Triple jump: Viktor Sotnikov, Igor Gavrilenko, Aleksandr Aseledchenko
Shot put: Vyacheslav Lykho

Women
60 m: Nadezhda Roshchupkina, Natalya Merzlyakova
200 m: Marina Zhirova
400 m: Tatyana Chebykina†, Olga Kotlyarova
800 m: Svetlana Masterkova
1500 m: Yekaterina Podkopayeva
3000 m: Lyudmila Petrova, Mariya Pantyukhova
High jump: Natalya Golodnova, Victoria Seregina
Pole vault: Galina Envarenko, Natalya Mekhanoshina
Long jump: Yelena Sinchukova, Nina Perevedentseva
Triple jump: Natalya Kayukova
Shot put: Irina Khudoroshkina
Pentathlon: Yelena Lebedenko, Irina Vostrikova

† Had exemption for selection and allowed not to compete at the national championships

References

Results
На стадионах страны и мира. Чемпионат России по многоборьям // Лёгкая атлетика : журнал. — 1996. — № 4. — С. 23—24.
Шанс для молодых // Лёгкая атлетика : журнал. — 1996. — № 3. — С. 4—5.

Russian Indoor Athletics Championships
Russian Indoor Athletics Championships
Russian Indoor Athletics Championships
Russian Indoor Athletics Championships
Sports competitions in Moscow
Russian Indoor Athletics Championships